Sonika is a feminine given name.

Notable people with this name

 Sonika Chauhan (1989–2017), Indian model, actor and TV host
 Sonika Kaliraman (born 1983), Indian wrestler
 Sonika Mckie (born 1988), Grenadian singer-songwriter, known by the stage name Sonika
 Sonika Nirwal (born 1977), English politician
 Sonika Tandi (born 1997), Indian field hockey player

Other spellings
Sonequa Martin-Green (born 1985), American actress

Fictional characters
 Sonika (software), a female vocal released for the Vocaloid 2 software by Zero-G Ltd

Feminine given names